Idhayathil Nee is 1963 Indian Tamil-language romance film, directed by V. Srinivasan and produced by V. Ramasamy. The film stars Gemini Ganesan and Devika. It was released on 14 June 1963.

Plot

Cast 
 Gemini Ganesan as Advocate Anandhan
 Devika as Radha
 M. R. Radha as Maari Muthu
 Lakshmi Rajyam as Kamala
 Nagesh as Arjunan
 K. A. Thangavelu as Kanmani, Anandhan's brother
 M. Saroja as Soodamani
 T. S. Muthaiah as Gopalakrishna Mudaliyar
 V. Gopalakrishnan as Shankar/Chinna Kannu
 Kumari Rukmini as Anandhan's Step Mother/Kanmani's mother
 Sattaampillai K.N.Venkatraman as Soodamani's father
 V. S. Raghavan as Nellaiyappan, Radha's grandpa

Soundtrack 
Music was composed by Viswanathan–Ramamoorthy and lyrics were written by Vaali and
Mayavanathan. A duet number, "Thingalukku", had been recorded but was omitted from the final cut as singer S. Janaki felt it was too similar to "Azhagukkum Malarukkum" from Nenjam Marappathillai (1963).

Release and reception 
Idhayathil Nee was released on 14 June 1963. In Sport and Pastime, T. M. Ramachandran said the film is "so deplorable that every discriminating movie-goer will consider it a sheer waste of celluloid."

References

External links 
 

1960s romance films
1960s Tamil-language films
1963 films
Films directed by Muktha Srinivasan
Films scored by Viswanathan–Ramamoorthy
Indian black-and-white films
Indian romance films